Nationality words link to articles with information on the nation's poetry or literature (for instance, Irish or France).

Events
 The return to power of Charles II of England, with a triumphant entrance into London on May 29, results in the publication of numerous panegyrics and similar verse by English poets praising the monarch. However, the anti-monarchist John Milton is forced into hiding as a warrant for his arrest is in force until the summer and his writings are burned.

Works published
 Elias Ashmole, Sol in Ascendente; or, The Glorious Appearance of Charles the Second, upon the Horizon of London, in her Horoscopicall Sign, Gemini, anonymous, on Charles II, who entered London on May 29 this year
 Charles Cotton, A Panegyrick to the King's Most Excellent Majesty
 Abraham Cowley:
 Ode, Upon the Blessed Restoration and Returne of His Sacred Majestie, Charls, on Charles II, who entered London on May 29 of this year
 writing under the pen name "Ezekiel Grebner", a purported grandson of Paul Grebner, The Visions and Prophecies Concerning England, Scotland, and Ireland of Ezekiel Grebner, published this year, although the book states "1661"; a royalist political satire, in prose and verse
 Sir William Davenant:
 "A Panegyric to his Excellency the Lord General Monck", to George Monck
 "Poem, Upon His Sacred Majesties Most Happy Return to His Dominions", on Charles II, who entered London on May 29 of this year
 Sir Robert Howard, Poems
 John Phillips, Montelion, 1660; or, The Proheticall Almanack, published under the pen name "Montelion, knight of the oracle, a well-wisher to the mathematicks", a verse satire on William Lilly's almanacs
 Robert Wild, Iter Boreale
 John Wilmot, Earl of Rochester:
 Epicedia Academiæ Oxoniensis, a collection of poems offering condolence with the Queen Mother, Henrietta Maria, for the death of her daughter Mary, the Princess Royal; two poems in the collection have been attributed to John Wilmot, Earl of Rochester:  a Latin poem, "In Obitum Serenissimae Mariae Principis Arausionensis," and an English poem, "To Her Sacred Majesty, the Queen Mother, on the Death of Mary, Princess of Orange."
 Editor, Britannia Rediviva Oxford: Excudebat A. & L. Lichfield, Acad. Typogr., anthology
 George Wither, Speculum Speculativum; or, A Considering-Glass

Births
Death years link to the corresponding "[year] in poetry" article:
 By May – Anne Killigrew (died 1685), English poet and painter

Deaths
Birth years link to the corresponding "[year] in poetry" article:
 September 12 – Jacob Cats (born 1576), Dutch poet
 October 6 – Paul Scarron (born 1610), French poet, playwright and novelist
 date not known
 Faqi Tayran, also spelled "Feqiyê Teyran", pen name of Mir Mihemed (born 1590), Kurdish
 Sir Thomas Urquhart (born 1611), Scottish

See also

 Poetry
 17th century in poetry
 17th century in literature
 Restoration literature

Notes

17th-century poetry
Poetry